Genpact is an American professional services firm legally domiciled in Bermuda with its headquarters in New York City, New York. The company currently employs more than 100,000 people and provides services to clients in over 30 countries worldwide. Genpact is listed on the NYSE and in 2021 generated revenues of US$3.71 billion.

History

Founding and early developments 
Genpact was founded in 1997 as a unit of General Electric. The company was founded as GE Capital International Services (GECIS) in New Delhi. Starting with 20 employees under the leadership of CEO Pramod Bhasin, its charter was to provide business process outsourcing solutions to GE's businesses. In the beginning, GECIS created processes for outsourcing back-office activities for GE Capital such as processing car loans and credit card transactions. It was an experimental concept at the time and the beginning of the Business-Process-Outsourcing (BPO) industry.

One year after its launch, GECIS employed about 800 people and generated revenues of US$4 million. By 2001, GECIS operations had grown to 12,000 employees and the company began to manage a wide range of processes across GE's financial services and manufacturing businesses. Jack Welsh, CEO of GE at the time, said that GECIS was a key driver of GE’s growth between 1998 and 2001, and was responsible for reducing operating costs by approximately US$1 billion.

In 2003, GE reduced its stake in GECIS to 40% and sold the remainder to two American private equity firms. At the time of the sale, GECIS employed around 13,000 people in India and 4,000 people in the US, China, Hungary and Mexico, providing a range of solutions in areas such as finance and accounting, insurance claim processing, IT management and technical support.  

By 2004, GECIS oversaw around 700 business processes for GE that had migrated from the US to India, generating revenues of US$426 million.

Independence and international growth 
In January 2005, the company became independent and started to serve clients outside of GE. As part of this transition, the company changed its name to Genpact for “generating business impact.” Also in 2005, the company opened additional offices in India and by the end of the year, recorded US$493 million in revenue, with 15% coming from new global clients, and the remaining 85% from GE. In 2006, Genpact further expanded in India, the Philippines, Mexico and China.

In August 2007, Genpact was listed on the NYSE under the symbol 'G'. The company continued to grow, opening offices in six additional countries that same year and launching a joint venture with the Indian company NDTV to offer outsourcing services for the media industry. In 2008, the company crossed US$1 billion in revenue, with 53% coming from clients other than GE.

From 2010 onward, the company increasingly focused its operations and presence in Europe and the US. As part of its shift west, the company moved its headquarters to New York and in 2011, Bhasin stepped down as CEO and became non-executive vice chairman of the company. He was succeeded on 17 June 2011 by NV "Tiger”" Tyagarajan, who was appointed to the Board of Directors and became Genpact's new CEO.  Tyagarajan was previously CEO of Genpact from 1999 to 2002, when he led the business through a critical growth phase as a subsidiary of GE. When Genpact became an independent company, he rejoined the firm from GE Capital U.S. as executive vice president of sales and business development from 2005 to 2009. Thereafter, he took on the role of the firm's chief operating officer, before being named CEO in 2011.

Bain Capital became the firm's largest shareholder in October 2012.

In February 2019, Genpact contractors in Hyderabad who were assigned content moderation tasks for Facebook reportedly experienced psychological trauma while evaluating videos depicting suicide, torture, terrorism, and pornography.

Recent developments 
In September 2020, UK Medicines and Healthcare products Regulatory Agency contracted Genpact to supply an Artificial intelligence software tool to process the expected high volume of COVID-19 vaccine Adverse drug reactions to ensure that no details from the ADRs reaction texts are missed. MHRA and Genpact announced an expansion of the partnership in January 2022. In August 2021, Genpact signed a multi-year digital transformation contract with Coca-Cola Beverages in Africa.

During the COVID-19 pandemic, Genpact opened its internal learning and reskilling platform, "Genome", to public access.

That same year, the company expanded its operations in Germany, and was added to the S&P 400 Mid-Cap Index. The company also signed an agreement with the National Institute of Industrial Engineering in Mumbai to establish a Digital Manufacturing and Supply Chain center, supporting the transformation from traditional to digital manufacturing.

In 2022, Genpact was added to the Bloomberg Gender Equality Index.

Acquisitions 

 April 2016: Endeavour Software Technologies, an enterprise mobility software company
 August 2017: TandemSeven, an experience design company
 September 2017: OnSource, a provider of an Inspection-as-a-Service (IaaS) product for property and casualty (P&C) insurance carriers and their customers
 June 2018: Commonwealth Informatics, a provider of cloud-based drug safety analytics products and services for medical research and healthcare delivery
 July 2018: Barkawi Management Consultants, a  supply chain management firm
 January 2019: riskCanvas, an end-to-end Financial Crimes software platform
 October 2019, Rightpoint, a digital consultancy
 January 2021: Enquero a data engineering and analytics firm

Corporate affairs

Organizational structure 
Genpact operates worldwide and is currently active in more than 30 countries.

Management structure 
Genpact is managed by a leadership team of 17 members (2022), that the company refers to as Genpact Leadership Council. N.V. "Tiger" Tyagarajan has served as president and CEO of Genpact since 2011.

Locations 
South Africa, China, India, Japan, Malaysia, Singapore, Philippines, Barbados, Costa Rica, Brazil, Guatemala, Mexico, Egypt, Israel, Turkey, Canada, USA, France, Hungary, Germany, Netherlands, Nordics, Poland, Portugal, Republic of Ireland, Romania, Switzerland, United Kingdom, Australia.

Products 

In June 2017, Genpact announced Genpact Cora, an artificial intelligence (AI)-based platform for enterprises. The platform has an application program interface (API) design and open architecture that includes Genpact’s own intellectual property as well as other providers. The platform's claimed benefits include deciphering large chunks of data, seamless customer service, faster financial reporting, and increasing speed to market.

See also

 List of IT consulting firms

References

External links 
  

Business services companies established in 1997
Companies listed on the New York Stock Exchange
Business process outsourcing companies of India
Business process outsourcing companies of the United States
Information technology consulting firms of the United States
International information technology consulting firms
Outsourcing companies
Software companies of India
Information technology companies of Bhubaneswar
Information technology companies of India
Former General Electric subsidiaries
Publicly traded companies based in New York City
Financial technology companies
Software companies based in New York (state)
Software companies based in New York City
2007 initial public offerings
Corporate spin-offs
Offshore companies of Bermuda